Podmočani is a village in the Resen Municipality of the Republic of North Macedonia, north of Lake Prespa.

Demographics
Podmočani is inhabited by an Orthodox Macedonian majority and during the course of the 20th century by a small Sunni Muslim Albanian minority. During the late Ottoman period, Macedonian Muslims also used to reside in Podmočani.

Podmočani has 306 residents as of the most recent national census of 2002. The population had increased to 875 in 1981, but has declined in every census since.

Gallery

People from Podmočani
Panaret Bregalnički (1878 - 1944), Orthodox bishop
Atanas Gl'mbočki (1880 - 1926), revolutionary
Eftim Kitančev (1868 - 1925), first president of the Bulgarian Olympic Committee
Trajko Kitančev (1858 - 1895), revolutionary
Kočo Kočovski (? - 1903), revolutionary

References

Villages in Resen Municipality